Mohammad Ahsan (born 19 July 1980) is a cricketer who plays for the Kuwait national cricket team. He played in the 2013 ICC World Cricket League Division Six tournament. In June 2019, he was named in Kuwait's Twenty20 International (T20I) squad for their series against Qatar. He made his Twenty20 International (T20I) debut for Kuwait against Qatar on 4 July 2019.

References

External links
 

1980 births
Living people
Kuwaiti cricketers
Kuwait Twenty20 International cricketers
Pakistani expatriates in Kuwait
Place of birth missing (living people)